Heshmatabad (also Romanized as Ḩeshmatābād and Hashmatābād) is a village in Heshmatabad Rural District, in the Central District of Dorud County, Lorestan Province, Iran. At the 2006 census, its population was 732, in 168 families.

References 

Towns and villages in Dorud County